The men's 5000 metres sprint competition of the athletics events at the 1979 Pan American Games took place on 11 July at the Estadio Sixto Escobar. The defending Pan American Games champion was Domingo Tibaduiza of Colombia.

Records
Prior to this competition, the existing world and Pan American Games records were as follows:

Results

Final

References

Athletics at the 1979 Pan American Games
1979